Soltani (also Romanized as Solţānī) is a village in Sumay-ye Jonubi Rural District, Sumay-ye Beradust District, Urmia County, West Azerbaijan Province, Iran. At the 2006 census, its population was 609, in 123 families.

References 

Populated places in Urmia County